Puka Qaqa (Quechua puka red, qaqa rock, "red rock", Hispanicized spelling Pucaccacca) is a mountain in the Andes of Peru, about  high. It is located in the Lima Region, Cajatambo Province, Cajatambo District. Puka Qaqa lies in the Pumarinri valley south of the Waywash mountain range and north of Millpu. The lakes named Quyllurqucha, Warmiqucha (Quechua for "woman lake", Huarmicocha) and Challwaqucha ("fish lake", Challhuacocha) lie at its feet.

See also 
 Millpu
 Pumarinri

References

Mountains of Peru
Mountains of Lima Region